David George Bronner (born January 22, 1945) is an American businessman. He is best known as the head of Retirement Systems of Alabama (RSA), the pension fund for employees of the State of Alabama. Bronner briefly served as the chairman of US Airways in the 1990s when RSA owned many shares in the airline.

Life and career
Bronner was born in Cresco, Iowa, the son of George David and Marge Bronner. His father owned a pool hall in Minnesota.  He received his elementary and high school education in Austin, Minnesota. He obtained his Bachelor of Arts and Master of Arts degrees at Mankato State University (now Minnesota State University, Mankato), in Mankato, Minnesota.
From 1967 to 1969, Bronner was an instructor in the School of Business and Finance at Mankato State. 
He then entered the University of Alabama at Tuscaloosa, where he earned a J.D.  degree in 1971 and a Ph.D. in 1972.

After teaching in various graduate schools of Education and Business, he was appointed as assistant dean of the Law School at the University of Alabama.  Shortly thereafter, Bronner took his present job with RSA in 1973. At that time RSA had approximately $500 million of funds and was owed $1.5 billion by the state.  By the end of 2017, RSA had amassed over $38 billion in investments making RSA the 50th largest public pension fund in the world.

In 2022, 1819 News named Bronner the highest-paid state employee in Alabama, having taken an income of $834,034 the previous year.

External links
 Alabama’s One-Man Pension Show
 Retirement Systems of Alabama CEO David Bronner speaks to ASEA
 The story of Dr. David Bronner, the RSA and Robert Trent Jones Golf Courses
 INSIDE THE STATEHOUSE: David Bronner makes his mark on Alabama

References

American chief executives of financial services companies
Living people
1945 births
Minnesota State University, Mankato alumni
Minnesota State University, Mankato faculty
University of Alabama alumni
People from Cresco, Iowa